Semi Tadulala (born 3 March 1978) is a Fijian former professional rugby league footballer who played as a er for Australian Queensland Cup club Northern Pride. A Fiji international representative at rugby league and rugby union, he previously played in the National Rugby League for Australia's Melbourne Storm club, in the Super League for England's the Bradford Bulls and the Wakefield Trinity Wildcats (Heritage No. 1216), and in the Co-operative Championship for the Keighley Cougars. He has also played for Gloucester Rugby and Leeds Carnegie at rugby union.

Playing career
Tadulala played for Fiji in the 2000 Rugby League World Cup while playing for the Western Suburbs Panthers in the Queensland Cup. His first National Rugby League club was the Melbourne Storm whom he played with until 2003.

He then moved to the UK, joining the Wakefield Trinity Wildcats. Gloucester Rugby Union Club tried to sign him but the deal fell through and he returned to Wakefield, although he missed much of the 2006/2007 season with an arm injury. In August 2007, it was announced that he would leave Wakefield.

He was named in the Fiji training squad for the 2008 Rugby League World Cup.

Bradford Bulls
Tadulala signed for the Bradford Bulls in September 2007. He scored eight tries, including two hat-tricks, for the Bulls in his first eight games. He ended his first season with Bulls as the club's leading tryscorer for the 2008 campaign. He signed a new one-year deal for the 2009 season.

Playing for Fiji in the 2008 World Cup
Tadulala played four games for Fiji in the 2008 Rugby League World Cup, including the 52-0 semi-final loss against Australia. He scored two tries during the competition.

Moving to rugby union with Gloucester
On 25 January 2010, following the conclusion of Fiji's European tour, Gloucester Rugby announced the signing of Tadulala on a short-term contract. However, in early May 2010, head coach Bryan Redpath announced on BBC Radio Gloucestershire that Tadulala was to be released at the end of the 2009/10 season. He played just two games for the club.

Leeds Carnegie
On 1 June 2010, it was announced that Tadulala had signed a two-year-deal with Leeds Carnegie.

Return to rugby league
On 1 July 2011, Tadulala re-signed for his old club Wakefield Trinity Wildcats until the end of the season.

On 17 December 2011, Tadulala signed for Keighley Cougars, continuing his work in an off-field capacity for previous club Wakefield, while on match terms at Cougar Park.

Return to Australia with Northern Pride
On 7 November 2012, Tadulala returned to Australia, signing for Australian Queensland Cup club Northern Pride and re-joining Jason Demetriou, the new Pride Head Coach and his former coach at Keighley Cougars.

Outside rugby
On 9 August 2009, Tadulala took part in a charity cricket match with many other Wakefield Trinity Wildcats players against Wakefield St Michaels, to raise money for the Adam Watene Fund.

References

External links

1978 births
Fijian rugby league players
Melbourne Storm players
Fiji national rugby league team players
Bradford Bulls players
Wakefield Trinity players
Fijian rugby union players
Living people
Keighley Cougars players
Wests Panthers players
Northern Pride
Leeds Tykes players
Gloucester Rugby players
Fijian expatriate rugby union players
Expatriate rugby union players in England
Fijian expatriate sportspeople in England
Rugby league wingers
Fiji international rugby union players